Carron is a small village on the north bank of the River Spey in Moray, Scotland.

It was the site of an old distillery, the Imperial Distillery until the distillery closed in 1998 and was mothballed.

In 2015, a new distillery, Dalmunach  opened in the village.

Carron had a station on the Strathspey Railway, until the line closed in the 1960s. The railway line has since become the Speyside Way long-distance path.

Notable people
Jack Richardson (1912–1990), cricketer

References

Villages in Moray